Tukituki is a New Zealand parliamentary electorate, returning one Member of Parliament to the New Zealand House of Representatives. Named after the Tukituki River which runs through the electorate, it was established for the 1996 general election and has existed since. The current MP for Tukituki is Anna Lorck of the Labour Party, who won the seat from the National Party's Lawrence Yule at the 2020 general election.

Population centres
Tukituki was created ahead of the change to mixed-member proportional (MMP) voting at the 1996 election; it is a merger of the old Hastings seat with Central Hawke's Bay District. Tukituki centres on the southern Hawke's Bay region, with the bulk of the electorate's population coming from the city of Hastings, with other towns drafted in to bring the electorate up to the required population. In 2008, a general northwards tug on boundaries in the Taranaki, Manawatū-Whanganui and Hawke's Bay regions saw Waipukurau and Waipawa moved into the Wairarapa electorate, in exchange for which Tukituki gained the suburbs and towns around Cape Kidnappers from the Napier electorate. No boundary adjustments were undertaken in the subsequent 2013/14 redistribution.

History
Labour's Rick Barker, who had represented Hastings since 1993 was elected as MP for Tukituki, and re-elected twice before a large provincial swing to the National Party in 2005 cost Barker his seat. This was the third time in over thirty years that a Hastings electorate had elected a National MP – the other two times being National's landslide victories in 1975 and 1990.

Ranked 47th on National's party list, Foss did not enter Parliament.

He was returned to the 49th Parliament with a greatly increased majority in the 2008 election.

On 14 December 2016, Foss announced that he would quit politics at the 2017 general election. The electorate was won at the election by Lawrence Yule, retaining it for the National Party.

Members of Parliament
Key

List MPs
Members of Parliament elected from party lists in elections where that person also unsuccessfully contested the Tukituki electorate. Unless otherwise stated, all MPs terms began and ended at general elections.

Election results

2020 election

2017 election

2014 election

2011 election

Electorate (as at 26 November 2011): 44,708

2008 election

2005 election

1999 election
Refer to Candidates in the New Zealand general election 1999 by electorate#Tukituki for a list of candidates.

Notes

References

External links
 Electorate Profile  Parliamentary Library

New Zealand electorates
1996 establishments in New Zealand